Lawrence Bogorad (29 August 1921 – 28 December 2003) was an American botanist, pioneer of photosynthesis research and President of the American Association for the Advancement of Science. He was a member of the American Academy of Arts and Sciences, the National Academy of Sciences, and the American Philosophical Society.

External links 
 https://web.archive.org/web/20060902134840/http://mcb.harvard.edu/Bogorad/
National Academy of Sciences Biographical Memoir
 Guide to the Lawrence Bogorad Papers 1949-1952 at the University of Chicago Special Collections Research Center

References

1921 births
2003 deaths
American botanists

Members of the American Philosophical Society